Le Coucou is a French restaurant in New York City which opened in 2016. The restaurant's chef is Daniel Rose and Stephen Starr is the owner. The restaurant is located in 11 Howard, a hotel.


History and menu

History
Before beginning Le Coucou, Rose was a chef in Paris at his own restaurant, Spring. Rose continued to operate Spring after founding Le Coucou. Before formally partnering with Starr, Rose worked briefly in the kitchen of Starr's restaurant Buddakan. Rose has a reputation as a "cerebral" chef, in contrast to Starr's "mass-appeal" restaurants. However, Rose found Starr's existing roster of restaurants comforting as a source of support for Le Coucou.

The restaurant opened in June 2016. Roman and Williams designed the restaurant's interior. The décor includes a mural by artist Dean Barger, inspired by the works of French painter Hubert Robert.

The restaurant was closed for over a year during the COVID-19 pandemic. It reopened in November 2021. Four months were spent preparing for the reopening. Though Le Coucou serves primarily French food, the reworked menu included dishes based on recipes from Spain and Portugal. Rose has said these were included "to give people a sense that there’s a big wide world out there, even while travel is still a bit curtailed" due to the pandemic.

Anna Sorokin ate at the restaurant frequently while living in 11 Howard.

Menu
Rose has said the closed New York City French restaurant Lutèce inspired the menu at Le Coucou.

Reviews and accolades

Reviews
The restaurant received three stars from New York Times reviewer Pete Wells. Wells praised the restaurant's ability to downplay the intimidating aspects of haute cuisine while maintaining a sense of formality, writing that the restaurant has "an elegance that is well outside the everyday rumble of New York life but that doesn’t have...the off-putting reserve...from the old days." When comparing the restaurant to New York City French mainstay La Grenouille, Wells wrote that Le Coucou was superior in the quality of its food, service, and wine list.

See also
List of Michelin starred restaurants in New York City

References

2016 establishments in New York City
Michelin Guide starred restaurants in New York (state)
Restaurants in Manhattan
Restaurants established in 2016